Fyli Stadium is a multi-purpose stadium in Fyli northeastern corner of the West Attica regional unit, Greece. It is currently used mostly for football matches and is the home stadium of Thrasyvoulos F.C. The stadium holds 4,000 and was built in 1989.

Sports venues completed in 1989
Football venues in Greece
Multi-purpose stadiums in Greece
Venues of the 2004 Summer Olympics
Sports venues in Attica
Fyli
1989 establishments in Greece